Elmakırı is a village in the Taşova District, Amasya Province, Turkey. Its population is 205 (2021).

In records from 1928, the village was also known as Kirampa or Kirempe.

References

Villages in Taşova District